The North Loup Bridge brings a county road over the North Loup River, about 1.5 miles northeast of the village of North Loup in Valley County, Nebraska.  It was built in 1912-1913 by Empire Bridge Company of Omaha, Nebraska, at cost of $13,089, using steel parts fabricated by Cambria Steel Company and Lackawanna Steel Company.  It is a Pratt through truss bridge and includes three  through truss spans upon steel cylinder piers.  There is also a  pony truss approach span on the south side.

It was listed on the National Register of Historic Places in 1992.

References

Bridges on the National Register of Historic Places in Nebraska
Bridges completed in 1913
Buildings and structures in Valley County, Nebraska
Truss bridges
Transportation in Valley County, Nebraska
Steel bridges in the United States
Road bridges in Nebraska
1913 establishments in Nebraska